Motilal Singh is an Indian politician. He was elected to the Lok Sabha, lower house of the Parliament of India from Sidhi, Madhya Pradesh as a member of the Indian National Congress.

References

External links
 Official biographical sketch in Parliament of India website

India MPs 1980–1984
India MPs 1984–1989
India MPs 1991–1996
Lok Sabha members from Madhya Pradesh
Living people
Indian National Congress politicians
1943 births
Indian National Congress politicians from Madhya Pradesh